Tania Fares is a Lebanese fashion writer based in London with homes in Lebanon and Los Angeles, United States. In 2011, she founded and co-chaired, with Sian Westerman, the BFC Fashion Trust, a charity supported by the British Fashion Council. In 2018, she co-founded Fashion Trust Arabia with her co-chair, Sheikha Al-Mayassa bint Hamad bin Khalifa Al-Thani, which supports fashion designers in the MENA region. In 2021, she became a co-chair of the BFC Foundation alongside Narmina Marandi. In 2022, Tania co-founded Fashion Trust U.S. alongside Laura Brown, Anne Crawford, Tan France, Samira Nasr and Karla Welch.

Early life
Fares was born in Lebanon but grew up in Paris, where an uncle introduced her to the city's art and museums. She held an internship with Pierre Cardin.

Writing
Fares is a frequent contributor to British Vogue. 

She and Sarah Mower co-authored London Uprising: Fifty Fashion Designers, One City (Phaidon,). 

She and Krista Smith co-authored Fashion in LA.

Personal life
Fares resides in Los Angeles, Beirut, Paris, and London. In Lebanon, she lives in a home in the mountains above Beirut, designed by Nabil Gholam.

References

External links
 
 

Year of birth missing (living people)
Living people
Lebanese women writers
Lebanese women in business
Fashion journalists